The Greek Basket League Most Spectacular Player, or Greek Basket League MSP, is an annual award for the "most spectacular player" of each season of Greece's top-tier level professional basketball club league, the Greek Basket League. The award is given to the player that is deemed to have the most impressive highlight plays of the season, and that tend to be slam dunk plays.

Most spectacular players

References

External links
 Official Greek Basket League Site 
 Official Greek Basket League YouTube Channel 
 Official Hellenic Basketball Federation Site 
 Basketblog.gr 
 GreekBasketball.gr 

Greek Basket League
Most Spectacular Player
European basketball awards